The Lost Village (French: Le village perdu) is a 1947 French drama film directed by Christian Stengel and starring Gaby Morlay, Alfred Adam and Line Noro. It is based on a novel by Gilbert Dupé. The film's sets were designed by the art director Lucien Aguettand.

Synopsis
The villagers of Haute-Savoie live in terror following a series of suspicious deaths.

Cast

References

Bibliography 
 Rège, Philippe. Encyclopedia of French Film Directors, Volume 1. Scarecrow Press, 2009.

External links 
 

1947 films
1947 drama films
French drama films
1940s French-language films
Films directed by Christian Stengel
French black-and-white films
1940s French films